The 2009 Austin mayoral election was held on May 9, 2009. Incumbent Mayor Will Wynn was term-limited. No candidate received a majority of the vote, which would have precipitated a runoff election, but second-place finisher Brewster McCracken withdrew from the race  making Lee Leffingwell the winner by default.

Candidates
 David Buttross
 Josiah James Ingalls
Lee Leffingwell - Austin City Councilman
Brewster McCracken - Austin City Councilman
Carole Keeton Strayhorn - former Austin mayor, former Texas Comptroller, 2006 Independent gubernatorial candidate

Election results

References

2009 Texas elections
2009 United States mayoral elections
2009
Non-partisan elections